Harlow Loomis Robinson (born 20 September 1950) is a Matthews Distinguished University Professor of History at Northeastern University who specializes in Soviet and Russian cultural history, with writings on Soviet film and performing arts.

Background
Robinson was born in Bristol, Connecticut. During high school, inspired by the film adaption of Dr. Zhivago, he started studying Russian on a program to Cornell University. He also studied Russian music and literature.  In 1972, he received a BA in Russian from Yale University and graduated Phi Beta Kappa, Magna cum laude.  He took a "world tour" that included crossing Asia by the Trans-Siberian Railway. In 1975, he received an MA in Slavic languages and literature, followed in 1980 a doctorate also in Slavic languages and literatures, both at the University of California at Berkeley. His doctoral thesis was on "The Operas of Sergei Prokofiev and Their Russian Literary Sources," for which he spent an academic year in the Soviet Union.

Career
Before studying for his doctorate, Robinson worked as a journalist for his hometown Bristol newspaper as well as the Hartford Courant.  During his "world tour," he also taught English in Japan (1972–1973).

Robinson began his academic career as assistant professor in the Slavic department of the State University of New York at Albany (SUNY Albany) (1980-1994), where he chaired the departments of Slavic languages and literature (1992-1994) and Germanic and Slavic languages and literature (1994-1995).

In 1996, Robinson moved to Northeastern University in Boston, where he has taught courses on Russian cultural history, history of Soviet cinema, the image of Russia in American culture, and Prague, Vienna, Budapest 1867-1918. At Northeastern, he has also served as chair of Modern Languages (1996–99), Cinema Studies (Acting Director, 1998–99), International Affairs Program (2000-2001 advisor), and Department of History (2013–14). He served as vice president of the American Association of Teachers of Slavic and East European Languages.

Robinson has delivered public lectures at the Boston Symphony, New York Philharmonic, Metropolitan Museum of Art, Metropolitan Opera, Lincoln Center, Philadelphia Orchestra, Los Angeles Music Center Opera, Guggenheim Museum, San Francisco Symphony, Rotterdam Philharmonic, Aspen Music Festival and Bard Festival.

He has worked as a consultant for performing arts organizations and has served as writer and commentator for PBS, NPR and the Canadian Broadcasting System.

Fellowships, honors, awards

 2010: Academy Film Scholar the Academy of Motion Picture Arts and Sciences 
 2010: Institutional Grants Committee from the Academy of Motion Picture Arts and Sciences for research on Oscar-winning director Lewis Milestone 
 Fellowship/grant, American Council of Learned Societies 
 Fellowship/grant, Fulbright 
 Fellowship/grant, Whiting Foundation

Works

Major publications include:

 The legend of the invisible city of Kitezh and the maiden Fevronia: An opera in four acts, libretto by Vladimir Ivanovich Belsky, English version by Harlow Robinson (Melville, NY: Belwin-Mills, 1984)
 Sergei Prokofiev: A Biography (New York: Viking Press, 1987) (1988) (2002)
 The Last Impresario: The Life, Times and Legacy of Sol Hurok (New York: Viking Press, 1994) (1995)
 Selected Letters of Sergei Prokofiev, translated, edited and introduced by Harlow Robinson (Boston: Northeastern University Press, 1998)
 Vasilisa the fair,  based on The frog princess and other Russian folk tales by Sophia Prokofieva and Irina Tokmakova, music by Alla Lander, translated by Sabina Modzhalevskaya and Harlow Robinson, adapted by Adrian Mitchell (New York: Samuel French, 2003)
 Russians in Hollywood, Hollywood's Russians (Lebanon, NH: University Press of New England, 2007)
 Lewis Milestone:Life and films (Lexington, KY: University of Kentucky Press: 2019)

He has also contributed essays, articles, and reviews to the: New York Times, Los Angeles Times, The Nation, Opera News, Opera Quarterly, Dance, Playbill, Symphony and other publications.

See also

 Sergei Prokofiev
 Sol Hurok
 Lewis Milestone

References

1952 births
21st-century American historians
21st-century American male writers
Cornell University alumni
Historians of communism
American male non-fiction writers
Living people
Historians of Russia
Stalinism-era scholars and writers